Marc-Gilbert Guillaumin known as Marc'O (original spelling Marc, O ) (born April 10, 1927) is a French writer, researcher, director, playwright, and filmmaker.

Filmography

Films 
 1954 : Closed vision (long métrage) (2010 : sortie en DVD du film (Les périphériques vous parlent).).
 1958 : Voyage au bout de mon rêve (court métrage)
 1967 : Les Idoles (long métrage tiré de sa pièce) – reprise 2004. Octobre 2016, sortie en DVD du film (chez Luna Park Films).
 1970 : Tamaout (long métrage documentaire)

References

External links
 

French filmmakers
1927 births
Living people